Miller Township is one of fourteen townships in Dearborn County, Indiana. As of the 2010 census, its population was 9,810 and it contained 3,651 housing units.

History
Miller Township was organized in 1834.

Geography

Cities and towns
 Bright (south half)
 Hidden Valley (vast majority)

Major highways
  Indiana State Road 1

Cemeteries
The township contains three cemeteries: Georgetown, Pelley and Sugar Ridge.

References
 United States Census Bureau cartographic boundary files
 U.S. Board on Geographic Names

External links

 Indiana Township Association
 United Township Association of Indiana

Townships in Dearborn County, Indiana
Townships in Indiana
1834 establishments in Indiana
Populated places established in 1834